The Opera Awards is an singing competition for professional Australian opera singers. It was established in 1986 with the purpose of assisting and developing professional Australian opera singers. This is achieved through programs of study with selected international educational institutions, engagements with professional opera companies, as well as through introduction, networking and educational opportunities with prominent members of the international operatic community.

The Opera Awards consists of a group of awards, including the YMF Australia Award and the Armstrong-Martin Scholarship, amongst others.  Major sponsors and supporters of the awards have included Youth Music Foundation (YMF) Australia, the Armstrong-Martin Estate, Haas Foundation, The Glyndebourne Festival Opera (UK), the Royal Over-Seas League (UK) and the Australian Elizabethan Theatre Trust.

History 
In 1986/87, the Music & Opera Singers Trust (MOST) created the Opera Awards as a competition within the Australian SInging Competition, and then as a separate, stand-alone competition in 2001.

The competition provides cash prizes, scholarships and career opportunities to professional Australian opera singers, enabling the study of grand opera and related music overseas.

Since 2007, the primary award within the Opera Awards is the YMF Australia Award, sponsored by YMF Australia. The recipient of the Opera Awards receives a group of awards, scholarships and opportunities which include the YMF Australia Award, the Armstrong-Martin Scholarship, the Haas Foundation Award and the Editorial Resources Prize.

Runners-up  receive prizes and opportunities which include (in 2011) The Royal Over-Seas League (UK) Music Bursary, the Britten-Pears Young Artists Programme, the Glyndebourne Festival Prize, and the 4MBS Classic FM Award.

The recipient of the Opera Awards (Australia) is acknowledged and invited to perform at the Finals Concert of the Australian Singing Competition.

Opera Awards (Australia) recipients

References

External links 
 
 
 Australian Singing Competition website
 Music & Opera Singers Trust Limited (MOST) website
 Youth Music Foundation (YMF) Australia website

Opera competitions
Music competitions in Australia
Music organisations based in Australia
Arts organizations established in 1986
1986 establishments in Australia